Sennen Cove Lifeboat Station is the base for Royal National Lifeboat Institution (RNLI) search and rescue operations for the sea around Land's End, Cornwall in the United Kingdom. The first lifeboat was stationed at Sennen Cove in 1853. Since 2009 it has operated a  all weather boat (ALB) and a  inshore lifeboat (ILB).

History
Sennen Cove is situated just to the north of Land's End, the most westerly point in mainland England. Following the loss of the New Commercial on the Brisons in January 1851, the RNLI built a boathouse at the top of the beach in 1853 and extended it in 1864 when a larger lifeboat was sent to the station. In 1876 a new boathouse was built on the landward side of the road, but in 1896 it was replaced by a new one on the site of the original building.

A motor lifeboat was sent to the station in 1922. In preparation for this, the boathouse was given a new slipway in 1919 and a turntable was provided inside so that the lifeboat could be hauled up the slipway bow-first and then turned ready for its next service. Ten years later a second slipway was provided.

In 1994 an ILB was added to the station. This is kept in the boathouse. When it was to be launched it was craned onto the slipway and taken down to the water on a carriage, but a new slipway was provided to make launching the ILB easier at low tide. At the same time the boathouse was modified to take a longer  boat, and in 2001 the roof was removed and a new one installed ready for the receipt of a taller, faster  lifeboat. New crew facilities were installed at the same time.

Service awards
The volunteer crews of the RNLI do not expect reward or recognition for their work, but the records include many rescues that have been recognised by letters, certificates and medals from the RNLI management. This list is just some of the most notable.

An RNLI silver medal was awarded in 1868 to both Coxswain Nichols and Coastguard Officer S Morrison for rescuing the sole survivor of the Devon. A later coxswain, Henry Nicholas, received a silver medal in 1909 for a meritorious service to the Fairport when it was in trouble.

In 1919 the Sennen Cove Lifeboat was recognised for rescuing eight people from the SS Falmouth Castle. A silver medal and three bronze medals being given to members of the crew. That same year saw Henry Nicholas receive another silver medal along with Second Coxswain Thomas Pender, while the 12 crew members were awarded bronze medals for saving eight people from a motor launch. One of the crew was 17-year-old Henry Nicholas Junior. He later became coxswain and was awarded another bronze medal in 1964 for leading the rescue of five people from the trawler Victoire Roger which had caught fire.

A search for the sinking MV Union Crystal saw Coxswain/Mechanic H E Pengilly awarded with a silver medal. Another sinking vessel, the Tungufoss, resulted in seven lives being saved and Coxswain/Mechanic Maurice Hutchens receiving a silver medal in 1981. In 1995 Coxswain Terence George was awarded a bronze medal for the rescue of five people from the fishing vessel Julian Paul.

Description
The lifeboat station stands on the beach at the head of two slipways. The masonry walls date from 1929 but the shallowly curved metal roof was added in 2001. Inside, as well as the boathouse, is a three-storey crew facility. The ground floor is a changing room for the ILB crew, above that is a similar facility for the ALB crew, and on the top floor is a crew room.

Area of operation

Fleet

All weather Boats

Inshore lifeboats

See also

 List of RNLI stations

References

External links
 Official station website
 RNLI station information

Lifeboat stations in Cornwall
Sennen